Dulhan Wahi Jo Piya Man Bhaye (English:Bride is one who is liked by the groom) is a 2021 Bhojpuri-language romantic drama film written and directed by Rajnish Mishra and jointly produced by Abhay Sinha, Prashant Jammuwala and Samir Aftab under banner of "Yashi Films" and Ease My Trip.com. The film stars Khesari Lal Yadav, Madhu Sharma and, Kajal Raghwani in the lead role. Amit Shukla, Ananjay Raghuraj, Sammy Jonas Heaney, Padam Singh, Mehnaz Shroff, Anoop Arora, Ravi Arora, Pyare Lal Yadav, Neelkamal Singh and others appear supporting roles.

Cast
 Khesari Lal Yadav as Raja
 Madhu Sharma as Tulsi, Raja's wife
 Kajal Raghwani as Diya
 Ananjay Raghuraj as Sanjay, Raja's friend
 Padam Singh as Diya's father
 Amit Shukla as Raja's father
 Mehnaaz Shroff as Diya's mother
 Anoop Arora as Tulsi's father
 Ravi Arora
 Rajnish Mishra as Special appearance
 Monique Carrie
 Vikki Mead
 Sammy Johny
 Yanistha Dimitrova
 Ester Carbonero
 Norman Leroy Silvera

Production

Filming
According to the producers of the film, 90℅ of scenes were filmed in London. Some scenes shot in India.

Post-production
The film is written and directed by Rajnish Mishra and jointly produced by Abhay Sinha, Prashant Jammuwala and Samir Aftab with co-produced by Ranjit Singh, Ravi Arora and Madz Movies. The cinematography has been done by Vasu while choreography is by Sanjeev Kumar Sharma. Jitendra Singh (Jeetu) is the editor and Promo editing done by Umesh Mishra. Costume designed by Madhur Designz, Badshah Khan and Bhakti Joshi while Publicity designing done by Shakti Arts (Narsu). Ajay Maurya, Munna Maurya and Milan Manna are Art director. Production of this film was done by "Outside The Box Films Ltd" Studio and Post-production by "3 Studios".

Music

Music of this film was composed by Rajnish Mishra and lyrics penned by Kundan Preet, Pyare Lal Yadav, Yadav Raj, Ajit Halchal and Rajnish Mishra. Background music scored by Shekhar Singh. It was produced under "Filamchi" Label.

Track list

Release
The film was released to theatres on 14 January 2021 on occasion on Makar Sankranti at every major center of Bihar and Gujarat. Despite the COVID-19 guidelines.

The film is also released in Uttar Pradesh and Delhi later on 22 January 2021.

References

Indian romantic drama films
2021 films
2020s Bhojpuri-language films
2021 romantic drama films